The Armenian Ambassador to the United States is the official representative of the Government of Armenia to the Government of the United States.

List of representatives

Gallery

See also 

 Ambassadors of the United States to Armenia
 Armenia–United States relations
 Foreign relations of Armenia

References 

Ambassadors of Armenia to the United States
United States
Armenia